As a nickname, Hooky (or spelling variations thereof) may refer to:

 F. S. Bell (1897–1973), British Royal Navy captain nicknamed "Hookie", commanded HMS Exeter in the Second World War Battle of the River Plate
 Edgar Chadwick (1869–1942), English footballer and national coach of the Netherlands
 Hooks Dauss (1889–1963), American Major League Baseball pitcher
 Denys Hill (1896–1971), English cricketer
 Peter Hook (born 1956), British musician and singer
 Hookey Leonard (1901–1982), Scottish footballer
 John McPhail (footballer) (1923–2000), Scottish footballer
 Hook-handed man, a fictional character in the Lemony Snicket's A Series of Unfortunate Events called "Hooky" by other characters

See also 

Lists of people by nickname